Antonio Di Nardo (born 23 July 1979) is an Italian footballer who plays as a forward.

Club career 
Di Nardo grew up in Naples and initially played for Napoli's youth side before beginning his professional career in Serie C1 with Savoia in 1996. He subsequently played for Giugliano, Taranto, Benevento and Pistoia in Serie C2 and Serie C1. In 2006, he obtained promotion to Serie B with Frosinoine. In 2007, he was signed by Padova, with whom he played in Serie C1 and later Serie B.

In 2011 Di Nardo was sold to fellow Serie B club Cittadella on a free transfer. In 2013, he was signed by Ischia. In January 2014 he moved to Juve Stabia.

On 24 September 2014 Di Nardo was signed by Carrarese as a free agent.

References

External links 
 Aic.football.it 

1979 births
Living people
Italian footballers
Serie B players
Serie C players
Footballers from Naples
S.S. Ischia Isolaverde players
Association football forwards